Baldassare 'Baldo' di Gregorio (born 22 January 1984 in Offenbach am Main) is a German football manager and football player who currently works for Germania Schwanheim as a playing manager. He also holds Italian citizenship.

A promising player in his youth, di Gregorio was featured in Don Balón's 2001 list of the 100 most promising young players in the world at number 19, one place ahead of Andrés Iniesta.

References

External links
 
 Baldo di Gregorio on FUPA.net

1984 births
Living people
German footballers
Eintracht Frankfurt II players
1. FC Schweinfurt 05 players
PFC Slavia Sofia players
Rot Weiss Ahlen players
SV Eintracht Trier 05 players
Sportspeople from Offenbach am Main
2. Bundesliga players
First Professional Football League (Bulgaria) players
Expatriate footballers in Bulgaria
Hammer SpVg players
Association football defenders
Footballers from Hesse